The Worker Protection Standard (WPS) is a United States Environmental Protection Agency (EPA) federal regulation (40 CFR Part 170), intended to protect employees on farms, forests, nurseries, and greenhouses that are occupationally exposed to agricultural pesticides. Restricted use pesticides control is managed by the EPA under this regulation. It includes the following requirements:
 Pesticide Safety Training
 Notification of Pesticide Applications to Employees and between Employers
 Application, Safety & Hazard Communication to Employees & Contract Workers
 Recordkeeping Requirements
 Use of Personal Protective Equipment
 Restricted Entry Intervals (REI) following Pesticide Application
 Decontamination Supplies
 Emergency Medical Assistance
 Application Exclusion Zone (enforcement starts January 1, 2018)

Other organizations and programs related in one way or the other to the administering of and reporting about WPS-based pesticide control include:
 AAPCO—Assoc. of American Pesticide Control Officials
 AAPSE—American Assoc. of Pesticide Safety Educators
 CTAG—Certification and Training Assessment Group
 CPARD—Certification Plan & Reporting Database
 POINTS—Pesticide of Interest Reporting Database
 NASDA Pesticide Safety Programs
 Division of Toxicology and Environmental Medicine; Agency for Toxic Substances and Disease Registry
 National Toxicology Program

See also
 Hazard Communication Standard, a regulation requiring all employers to disclose all hazards to employees separately from the WPS.

References

Industrial hygiene
Safety engineering
Environmental law in the United States
Occupational safety and health